The 2019–20 McNeese State Cowgirls basketball team represents McNeese State University during the 2019–20 NCAA Division I women's basketball season. The Cowgirls, led by fourth year head coach Kacie Cryer, play all their home games at the Health and Human Performance Education Complex. They are members of the Southland Conference.

Previous season
The Cowgirls finished the season 7–22, 5–13 in Southland play to finish in a tie for tenth place. They failed to qualify for the Southland women's tournament.

Roster

Schedule

|-
!colspan=9 style=| Non-conference regular season

|-
!colspan=9 style=| Southland regular season

See also
2019–20 McNeese State Cowboys basketball team

References

McNeese Cowgirls basketball seasons
McNeese State
McNeese State
McNeese State